Noosa North Shore is a coastal rural locality in the Shire of Noosa, Queensland, Australia.

Geography
It contains part of the Great Sandy National Park and the small town of Teewah. The name of the suburb refers to its location on the northern banks of the Noosa River.

The suburb is the southern end point of the Cooloola Great Walk.

Access to the suburb is provided by the cable ferry, Noosa River Ferry, which crosses the Noosa River at Tewantin. In order to maintain Noosa North Shore as a wilderness area, there are no plans to provide road or bridge access and there are restrictions on development.

History
In the  Noosa North Shore had a population of 121 people.

Although historically and currently within the Shire of Noosa, between 2008 and 2013 Noosa North Shore was within Sunshine Coast Region following an unpopular amalgamation of the shire into a larger local government area, followed by a subsequent disamalgamation after continual local agitation confirmed by a ballot.

References

External links

Suburbs of Noosa Shire, Queensland
Coastline of Queensland
Localities in Queensland